Pterostylis barbata, commonly known as the western bearded greenhood or bird orchid is a species of orchid endemic to the south-west of Western Australia. Flowering plants have a rosette of leaves at the base of the plant and a single translucent white flower with dark green veins on a flowering stem with up to 20 stem leaves. It is one of a number of bearded orchids, some of which have yet to be formally described, all of which have a distinctive feather-like labellum.

Description
Pterostylis barbata is a terrestrial, perennial, deciduous, herb with an underground tuber and when not flowering, a rosette of stalkless, pointed leaves. Flowering plants have a similar rosette and between ten and twenty stem leaves. The flower leans slightly forward and is shiny, pale translucent green with darker green veins and purple-brown markings at the front. Flowering occurs from July to September.

Taxonomy and naming
Pterostylis barbata was first formally described in 1840 by John Lindley and the description was published in A Sketch of the Vegetation of the Swan River Colony. The specific epithet (barbata) is a Latin word meaning "bearded".

Distribution and habitat
The western bearded orchid grows in shrubby woodland and forest, often in thick Casuarina leaf litter and often in small clumps. It occurs between Bindoon and Albany and is common in the Darling Range near Perth. Its range includes the Avon Wheatbelt, Esperance Plains, Jarrah Forest, Mallee, Swan Coastal Plain and Warren biogeographic regions.

There are twelve undescribed species of Pterostylis in Western Australia and the range of this species may be redefined when those descriptions are published.

Conservation
Pterostylis barbata is classified as "not threatened" by the Western Australian Government Department of Parks and Wildlife.

References

barbata
Endemic orchids of Australia
Orchids of Western Australia
Plants described in 1840